Adam Jones is a political scientist, writer, and photojournalist based at the University of British Columbia Okanagan in Kelowna, British Columbia, Canada. He is the author of Genocide: A Comprehensive Introduction and other books in genocide studies. He is Executive Director of Gendercide Watch. He was chosen as one of "Fifty Key Thinkers on the Holocaust and Genocide" for the book of that name, which was published in 2010. He is also a published photographer, both in print and online under a Creative Commons license.

Genocide
He is author of a textbook in the field, Genocide: A Comprehensive Introduction (Routledge, 3rd edn. 2016), and author or editor of other works on genocide and crimes against humanity, including The Scourge of Genocide: Essays and Reflections (Routledge, 2013). He was senior book review editor of the Journal of Genocide Research from 2004 to 2013, and currently edits the Studies in Genocide and Crimes against Humanity book series for Routledge Publishers.

Gender and international relations

Jones is known for his distinctive approach to the study of gender and international relations.

Works

References

External links

 Adam Jones - Homepage

Canadian political scientists
Political science writers
Academic staff of the University of British Columbia
Canadian human rights activists
Gender studies academics
Genocide studies scholars
Living people
1963 births